Rosasco is a comune (municipality) in the Province of Pavia in the Italian region Lombardy, located about 50 km southwest of Milan and about 45 km west of Pavia. As of 31 December 2004, it had a population of 691 and an area of 19.8 km².

Rosasco borders the following municipalities: Caresana, Castelnovetto, Cozzo, Langosco, Palestro, Pezzana, Robbio.

Demographic evolution

References

Cities and towns in Lombardy